The Ministry of Energy and Minerals  is one of the governmental bodies of Somaliland. The ministry has the function of developing and implementing policies related to electricity, minerals, petroleum and petroleum products, the current minister is Abdillahi Farah Abdi.

Scope of activities

Energy Sector Operations

DFID Somaliland is initiating a new five-year programme (2014-2019) to improve access to electricity with the introduction of Mini hybrid grids in Somaliland. The programme will be implemented in two phases
ADRA Somaliland is launching a new three-year project (2015-2017) to contribute to poverty alleviation, fragility reduction, and climate change mitigation for rural and peri-urban people in Somaliland.

Somaliland Oil Blocks

Genel Energy

In August 2012, Genel was awarded an exploration licence for onshore blocks SL-10-B and SL-13 in Somaliland, with a 75% working interest in both. Genel extended its presence in November 2012 with the acquisition of 50% participating interest in the Odwayne Production Sharing Agreement which covers blocks SL-6, SL-7, SL-10A.

Onshore Somaliland is a relatively unexplored region, with few exploration wells drilled. The total size of the blocks is approximately equivalent to the entire Kurdistan Region of Iraq.

Genel took the opportunity because of encouraging indications including onshore oil seeps and existing geological data showing favourable conditions for hydrocarbons to have accumulated in numerous large tilted fault blocks and sub-basins. In addition, the basins of Somaliland were contiguous to Yemen prior to the opening of the Gulf of Aden in the Oligocene-Miocene - similar sedimentary sequences and structural styles are expected in Somaliland.

Gravity and aeromag has been acquired and interpreted over the entire 40,000 square km acreage.

DNO ASA
Oslo, 8 September 2014 - DNO ASA, the Norwegian oil and gas operator, today announced that it has been granted a two-year extension of the term of its production sharing agreement for Block SL18 in Somaliland. The first exploration period will now end on 8 November 2017.

Block SL18, in which DNO has a 50 percent stake as operator, is a frontier exploration block. The partners have completed field survey and environmental assessment studies over the block and will initiate a planned seismic acquisition program once the Government of Somaliland has put in place a planned Oil Protection Unit (OPU) to support the international oil companies operating in Somaliland. The OPU is expected to be operational in 2015.

In the interim, security conditions permitting, DNO will resume a development program focused on drilling water wells to provide local communities in the areas covered by Block SL18 with potable water.

Ministers

See also

Politics of Somaliland
Cabinet of Somaliland

References

External links 
 Official Site of the Ministry

Government of Somaliland
Government ministries of Somaliland
Energy in Somaliland
Somaliland